The Protea Cup is a semi-professional rugby league competition in South Africa and is the national second division competition of South Africa. The current holders are the Tomahawks, who beat Loskop Leopards 32-30 in the 2021-22 Grand Final.

Current Teams 

Those highlighted in grey withdrew from the competition throughout the 2013-14 season.

Former Teams

See also

 Rhino Cup
 Western Province Rugby League

References

External links

South Africa Rugby League
Rugby league competitions
Sports leagues established in 2013
2013 establishments in South Africa